The Dossen Hut (German: Dossenhütte) is a mountain hut of the Swiss Alpine Club, located south of Meiringen in the canton of Bern, Switzerland. It lies at a height of 2,663 metres above sea level, on the watershed between the Reichenbachtal and the Urbachtal, north of the Dossen.

The Dossen Hut is used for the ascent of the Dossen, the Wetterhorn, the Mittelhorn and the Rosenhorn.

References
Swisstopo topographic maps

External links
Official website

Mountain huts in Switzerland
Buildings and structures in the canton of Bern
Mountain huts in the Alps